Lacuna Glacier is a glacier in Denali National Park and Preserve in the U.S. state of Alaska. The glacier begins on the south side of Mount Foraker in the Alaska Range, moving southwest to join the Yentna Glacier, to which Lacuna is a tributary.

See also
 List of glaciers

References

Glaciers of Matanuska-Susitna Borough, Alaska
Glaciers of Denali National Park and Preserve
Glaciers of Alaska